The Kabuli Bagh Mosque is a mosque in Panipat, Haryana, India which was built in 1527 by the emperor Babur to mark his victory over Sultan Ibrahim Lodhi at the first Battle of Panipat in 1526. The mosque is named after Kabuli Begum, Babur's wife.

Location

History

Construction of Mosque
The main building was built in 1527. Emperor Babur of Timurid dynasty defeated Sultan Ibrahim Lodhi in the first Battle of Panipat in 1526 at Panipat. It was the first conquest of the Mughals over Hindustan. A descendant of Tamerlane (Taimur Lung) who built this monument as a show of victory of the Mughals over the Pathan rulers of India. He built the Kabuli Bagh mosque in 1527.

Addition of Gates and Garden (1)
In 1527, the gate and the garden surrounding it were built.

Addition of Gates and Garden (2)
When Babur's son Humayun defeated Sher Shah Suri's descendants near Panipat, he added a masonry Platform to it and called it "Chabutra" Fateh Mubarak, bearing the inscription 934 Hijri (1557 CE). These buildings and the garden still exist under the name of Kabuli Bagh called so after Babur's wife – Mussammat Kabuli begum.

Architecture
Its architecture is to some extent a replica of royal mosques in Samarqand with large arched domes. Babur could not replicate the Timurid architecture fully as trained artisans and engineers were not available in India in creating this type of architecture.

There is an inscription dated 1527 which mentions the name of the King and the Queen and details about the builder. This inscription is on a distinct black marble stone.
The entire gate was built with bricks and red sandstone.

Features
The mosque built with bricks and stucco plaster within a compound wall faces north. The corners of the mosque have towers of octagonal shape on the northwest and south west directions.

Its entry gate built with bricks and red sandstone has an enclosed "bracket type lintel" opening of which is shaped like a large arch; its spandrels have ornamentation, enclosed in rectangular panels provided with arched recesses. The prayer hall is large and measures  , and is covered by a large dome.

There is a Qibla, a niche in the prayer chamber wall which is oriented towards Mecca. This central bay is visible even from the outside through its wide entrance opening. The mihrab here has an epigraph which includes the "Throne Verse from the Quran".

The prayer chamber is flanked on either side by "three-bayed triple-aisled side wings". The front face of the mosque is high and is made up of panels which have stucco work of lime plaster. Each of the two wings have nine bays and each bay is topped by a hemispherical dome founded on low cylindrical tholobates. The parapet wall has Persian inscriptions. A Chabutra-i-Fateh Mubarak is a masonry platform which surrounds the mosque, which was built during the reign of Humayun to mark his victory over Salim Shah. There is also a northern stone gate in the courtyard.

External galleries
 82-image online picture gallery of Kabuli Bagh Mosque taken by American Institute of Indian Studies in 2008 CE
 Online picture gallery of Indo-Islamic monuments of Haryana taken by American Institute of Indian Studies in 2008 CE

See also

Panipat Places Of Interest
Ibrahim Lodhi's Tomb
Lodi Gardens in Delhi
Humayun's Tomb
Aga Khan Historic Cities Support Programme

References

Bibliography

 
 

Mosques in Haryana
Panipat
Mughal mosques
Mosques completed in the 1520s
Religious buildings and structures completed in 1527